The Cerro de la Silla is a mountain and natural monument located within the metropolitan area of the city of Monterrey, Nuevo León, in northeastern Mexico. Named for its distinctive saddle-shaped profile when viewed from the west, it is a well-known symbol of the city of Monterrey, despite being located in the adjacent municipality of Guadalupe.

It covers an area of 60.5 square kilometres (23 mi2).

Set aside as a natural monument by the Mexican government in 1991, the mountain, or hill, as mountains are often referred to in Mexico, is a popular recreational area and is often climbed by hikers who take a  trail to reach the top. The ascent is considered to be fairly difficult, taking approximately 3 hours to complete. A panoramic view of the city of Monterrey can be seen from the top.

In the second half of the 20th century, an aerial tramway (Teleférico en Monterrey) was built on the north side of the mountain to give a fastest access to the iconic mountain for the population. The day of its inauguration on June 2, 1961, was also the day of its closure, as a tragic accident took the lives of five people, including the engineer Jesús Fernández, its designer. Only the upper station remains of the tramway. Several plans have been announced to rebuild another tramway with no results.

Some other known mountains or elevations of the zone are: Cerro de las Mitras, the Sierra Madre Oriental with the Cerro de Chipinque —the M-shaped figure visible from various parts of the city—, the Cerro del Topo Chico, Cerro del Obispado, Cerro de la Loma Larga and La Huasteca.

Gallery

References

External links

Cerro de la Silla information (Spanish)
Mexico Desconocido (Spanish)

Landmarks in Monterrey
Sierra Madre Oriental
Landforms of Nuevo León
Natural monuments of Mexico
Protected areas of Nuevo León
Silla
Rock formations of Mexico
North American 5000 m summits
Protected areas of the Sierra Madre Oriental